Trine 3: The Artifacts of Power is a 2015 action-adventure puzzle-platform video game developed by Frozenbyte, released on August 20, 2015 for Microsoft Windows. A PlayStation 4 version was released on December 22, 2015. It is the sequel to Trine 2 and features a return of the series' three protagonists and medieval fantasy location. The game is the first in the series to feature fully 3D gameplay. A port to the Nintendo Switch was released on July 29, 2019.

Gameplay
Similar to its predecessors, Trine 3: The Artifacts of Power is an action-adventure platform game with puzzle elements, which requires the players to utilize the skills of three different returning characters: Pontius, Amadeus and Zoya. Abilities varied among characters. Pontius is a knight equipped with a sword and a shield to defend himself against enemies. Zoya is a thief that is equipped with arrows and a grappling hook, while Amadeus is a wizard that has the ability to manipulate and levitate objects.  Players can swap between the three playable characters freely during the campaign. Trine 3 is the first game in the series to feature 3D gameplay, while the 2D gameplay remains the game's focus as with previous installments. The game also includes three-player co-operative multiplayer, special challenge levels and a level editor.

Plot
As in Trine 2, the Trine artifact summons Amadeus the wizard, Pontius the knight and Zoya the thief from across the realm for a quest, this time defending the Astral Academy. While the artifact gives the trio the power of immortality, they are tired of being bound this way, and decide to return the power to the Trine in return for their freedom. Their plan fails, though, and the artifact shatters, releasing an evil spirit known as Sarek, who rushes to the Academy.

The trio ventures into the Academy and learn from the spirit of the Trine that Sarek was a powerful wizard who became invincible by sealing his heart away; in doing so he became insane. Since no one could locate his heart, the only alternative to stopping him was binding his body. Two sisters did battle with him; they were successful but died in the process, creating the three artifacts of power (previously seen in the first Trine): one of the sisters, known as Trine, had her spirit encased in the artifact of soul, the other in the artifact of mind, and Sarek himself in the artifact of body. The two sisters were able to use the combined powers of the two artifacts to keep Sarek subdued, until the Trine was damaged.

The Trine is willing to take back the power she granted the heroes and release them if they collect all her shards and repair her, then find and destroy Sarek's heart. The trio agrees and finds one such shard. Meanwhile, Sarek has managed to locate the artifact of mind within the Astral Academy and corrupt the spirit of Trine's sister. The game then ends and the story is left incomplete. An easter egg in Trine 4 reveals they were indeed able to restore the Trine and defeat Sarek.

Development
The game was revealed by Frozenbyte on March 2, 2015. Alongside the announcement, a debut trailer was released. A nine-minute gameplay trailer of the game was released on April 9, 2015, showcasing the ways the three playable characters interact with the three-dimensional world. The game entered early access on April 21, 2015, so as to allow the company to receive player feedback regarding the new gameplay elements featured. The early access of the game only featured two maps, with the developers saying the full release would be "significantly longer". As promised, the game remained in the early access phase for "a few months" and was released on August 20, 2015 "initially" for Microsoft Windows. Ari Pulkkinen, the composer of the original Trine and Trine 2, returned to compose the music for Trine 3. The game's budget was $5.4 million, triple that of Trine 2.

The developer of the game called the introduction of 3D graphics something "challenging and time consuming", as the skills and the abilities of the three playable characters had to undergo overhaul and redesign without damaging the characters' characteristics.  Trine 3: The Artifacts of Power was released on August 20, 2015 for Microsoft Windows. In December 2015, a PlayStation 4 version of the game was announced.

Reception

Upon release, players complained that the game was too short. Frozenbyte later responded that if they had extended the length of the game, it would have cost $15 million, a price that they could not afford. Joel Kinnunen, VP from Frozenbyte, added that,"[they] tried to make something too ambitious, and it ended up financially impossible". While the developer was proud of the game they had created, Kinnunen indicated at the time that the future for the franchise "is now in question". A sequel, Trine 4, was eventually released in 2019 with critical acclaim.

References

External links
 
 Trine 3 at Frozenbyte

2015 video games
Action-adventure games
Asymmetrical multiplayer video games
Cooperative video games
Early access video games
Fantasy video games
Frozenbyte games
Linux games
MacOS games
Multiplayer and single-player video games
PlayStation 4 games
Puzzle-platform games
Side-scrolling platform games
Video games with Steam Workshop support
Video game sequels
Video games developed in Finland
Video games scored by Ari Pulkkinen
Video games with 2.5D graphics
Video games with user-generated gameplay content
Windows games